Vzglyad ("Glance", "View", "Look") may refer to:

Vzglyad (Russian TV program), a Soviet and Russian TV program 
 VIDgital, initially VID, a Russian production company, founded by Vzglyad creators
Vzglyad (newspaper), a Russian online newspaper produced by Konstantin Rykov